Lulu (composed from 1929 to 1935, premièred incomplete in 1937 and complete in 1979) is an opera in three acts by Alban Berg. Berg adapted the libretto from Frank Wedekind's two Lulu plays, Erdgeist (Earth Spirit, 1895) and Die Büchse der Pandora (Pandora's Box, 1904). 

The opera tells the story of a mysterious young woman known as Lulu, who follows a downward spiral from a well-kept mistress in Vienna to a street prostitute in London, while being both a victim and a purveyor of destruction. It explores the idea of the femme fatale and the duality between her feminine and masculine qualities. 

Berg died before completing the third and final act, and in the following decades the opera was typically performed incomplete. Since the 1979 publication of the version including Friedrich Cerha's orchestration of the act 3 sketches, it has become standard. Lulu is especially notable for using serialism at a time that was particularly inhospitable to it. Theodor W. Adorno wrote, "The opera Lulu is one of those works that reveals the extent of its quality the longer and more deeply one immerses oneself in it."

History

Sources 
Berg was familiar with Wedekind's Erdgeist by 1903, when he was 19. He also saw Die Büchse der Pandora in 1905 in a production by Karl Kraus on 29 May, and was inspired by the introductory speech that Kraus delivered on that occasion. In Wedekind's two Lulu plays, now often performed together under that title, Erdgeist forms the basis for the act 1 and act 2, scene 1, of the opera culminating in her shooting Dr. Schön, while Die Büchse der Pandora forms the basis for the rest of act 2 and act 3, Lulu's imprisonment, escape and subsequent decline and murder.

Composition 
Berg did not begin work on Lulu until after he had completed his other opera, Wozzeck, in 1929. Thanks to Wozzecks success Berg had economic security that enabled him to embark on a second opera. But life in the musical world was becoming increasingly difficult in the 1930s in both Vienna and Germany due to rising antisemitism and the Nazi cultural ideology that denounced the music of Berg, Webern, and others. Even to have an association with someone Jewish could lead to denunciation, and Berg had studied with the Jewish composer Arnold Schoenberg. Wozzeck'''s success was short-lived, as theatre after theatre succumbed to political pressure and refused to produce it, Erich Kleiber's 30 November 1932 production being the last, while sets and scenery were systematically destroyed. Wozzeck was also banned in the Soviet Union as "bourgeois". Berg found that opportunities for his work to be performed in Germany were growing scarce, and in September 1935 his music was proscribed as Entartete Musik (degenerate music) under the label Kulturbolschewismus (Cultural Bolshevism).

Despite these conditions, Berg worked on Lulu in seclusion at his lodge, the Waldhaus, in Carinthia. In the spring of 1934 he learned from Wilhelm Furtwängler that production of Lulu in Berlin would be impossible with the current cultural and political situation. It was at this point that he set the work on the opera aside to prepare a concert suite, in the event that the opera could never be performed, and also considered expanding it into a Lulu Symphony. This was his Symphonische Stücke aus der Oper "Lulu" (Lulu Suite) for soprano and orchestra. Kleiber performed the piece at the Berlin State Opera on 30 November, and despite an enthusiastic reception by some sections of the audience, condemnation by the authorities prompted Kleiber's resignation four days later and departure from Germany. The reaction of periodicals such as Die Musik and Zeitschrift für Musik was particularly hostile. On December 7, Goebbels made a speech equating atonality with "the Jewish intellectual infection," while the January 1935 issue of Die Musik suggested that any reviewer who had written anything favourable about the suite should be dismissed.

In January 1935, the Russian-born American violinist Louis Krasner, who had championed Berg's work in the United States, approached Berg to commission a violin concerto. Berg was reluctant to set aside Lulu for this, but the money ($1,500) was welcomed, as Berg was in financial difficulties, financially and artistically ruined by the Reichskulturkammer (Nazi cultural committee). At first there was only a tentative agreement, but at the end of March he told Krasner he would compose it and had started some preliminary work. But it was the tragic death of 18-year-old Manon Gropius (the daughter of Walter Gropius and Alma Mahler, whom the Bergs treated as their own daughter) on April 22 that prompted Berg to set aside Lulu for the concerto, which he dedicated to her. The concerto was completed swiftly, between April and August of that year, but the time he spent on it prevented him from completing the opera before his sudden death on December 24.

The following portions of the third and final act were fully scored: the first 268 bars; the instrumental interlude between scenes 1 and 2; and the finale of the opera, beginning with the monologue of Countess Geschwitz. (The last two of these passages comprise the fourth and fifth movements of the Lulu Suite that Berg compiled for concert performance.) The rest of the work remained in short score with indications of instrumentation for much of it. Berg heard the Symphonic Pieces in a BBC radio broadcast from the Queen's Hall, London, on 20 March 1935, conducted by Sir Adrian Boult and produced by Edward Clark. It was the first time he had ever heard any of the music of Lulu. He did not hear these excerpts performed live until a concert in Vienna on December 11, a fortnight before his death.

Roles

Berg specified that a number of cast members should take more than one role. Thus, the singers of Lulu's three husbands return as her clients while a prostitute: one performer each appears as the Doctor and the Professor, as the Painter and the Negro, and as Dr. Schön and Jack the Ripper. Other specified combinations are one mezzo-soprano as the Dresser, the Schoolboy, and the Groom; one tenor as the Prince, the Manservant, and the Marquis; one bass as the Animal Tamer and the Athlete, and another bass as the Theatre Manager and the Banker. Another aspect of the cast list that differs from Wedekind's original is that all characters in the two plays receive a proper name. Berg removed these names except for the five leading roles of Lulu, Schön, Alwa, Geschwitz and Schigolch. Some of Wedekind's other names have sometimes been applied to Berg's characters; for example, the Athlete is often called "Rodrigo Quast", but this name is not in the score.

Synopsis

It is the late 19th-century in an unnamed metropolis (usually taken to be Vienna). Lulu is married to Dr Goll, a physician. Lulu, who goes by the name Nelly, is having her portrait painted by Walter Schwarz, an artist who is in love with her. Dr Ludwig Schön, a newspaper editor and widower, and his son Alwa, a composer, are briefly present. As the artist pursues Lulu, they are surprised by her husband, who suffers a fatal stroke. Lulu marries Schwarz, and they appear to prosper with Schön's help. But Lulu is troubled when she discovers Schön has become engaged. The latter visits her and reveals how he has taken her from the street and raised her, but they have been in a relationship. He says that Schigolch, an elderly beggar, is her father. When Schön tells Schwarz about Lulu's past, he is horrified and he kills himself. Schön then puts Lulu on the stage, where she creates a scene over his fiancée and compels him to write a letter breaking off the engagement. Lulu marries Schön, who is jealous of her admirers, of which there are many, including the Countess Geschwitz and Alwa, on whom he eavesdrops, learning that Lulu poisoned his first wife. He gives her a gun and tells her to shoot herself. Instead she kills him, for which she is tried and imprisoned, but she contrives to escape after changing places with Countess Geschwitz. Alwa and Lulu flee to Paris, from where they once again flee, destitute, to London, where Lulu is obliged to work the streets, but brings home Jack the Ripper, who murders her.(Stage directions and musical notes in italics)PrologueThe animal tamer appears from behind the curtain, whip in handA circus animal tamer welcomes the audience, Hereinspaziert in die Menagerie (Come on in to the menagerie) and describes the various animals in his menagerie, such as tigers, bears and monkeys. He lifts the curtain, and calls for the snake to be brought on. A stage hand carries out Lulu (Lulu motif) dressed as Pierrot, while the animal tamer describes her in biblical terms as the source of evil, fated to murder, Sie ward geschaffen, Unheil anzustiften ... Zu morden – ohne dass es einer spürt. (She was created, evil to instigate ... to murder – without leaving any clues), and orders her off, while inviting the audience to see what will unfold. He then retires behind the curtain, which rises on scene 1.

Act 1Scene 1: A spacious but shabby artist's studio. A podium, folding screen, easel with unfinished portrait of Lulu, divan with tiger skin, step ladder and sculpture. Lulu is standing on the podium, posing as Pierrot, holding a shepherd's crookThe Painter is painting Lulu's portrait. Dr. Schön is watching, and is joined by his son, Alwa. He excuses himself because he has to go to a rehearsal, and he and Schön leave. Alone with Lulu, the Painter makes passes at her. She rejects him initially, as he pursues her round the studio (canon, beginning with Lulu motif: Gnädige Frau ... Frau Medizinalrat – Wer hätte das gedacht!; Dearest Lady ... Frau Medizinalrat – Who would have imagined it!), during which the ladder falls and the statue breaks. At one stage, he calls her Eva. She explains that she is expecting her husband. Eventually she succumbs to his advances. The artist has locked the studio door, and when Dr. Goll arrives, there is consternation. Goll breaks the door down, and on finding Lulu and the artist together, dies of a stroke. At first they do not realise her husband is dead and call a doctor. Lulu is alone with her husband's corpse (canzonetta: Auf einmal springt er auf; In a moment he will spring to life). When she accepts that he is dead, she reflects that she is now rich, to the artist's horror, Jetzt bin ich reich – Es ist grauenerregend (Now I am rich – How revolting). They sing a duet in which he questions her beliefs, and the answer is always the same, Eine Frage: Kannst Du die Wahrheit sagen? – Ich weiss es nicht (A question: Can you tell the truth? – I don't know). While Lulu is changing into her street clothes, the artist addresses her husband's corpse (arioso: Ich möchte tauschen mit Dir, Du Toter! Ich geb' sie Dir zurück; I would trade places with you, dead man. I would give her back to you).InterludeScene 2: An elegant drawing room in Lulu's apartment, the studio beyond, her finished portrait on the wall. Lulu, on a chaise-longue is gazing into her hand mirrorThe artist enters with the mail, again addressing her as Eve. In the mail he learns he has sold another painting of her, and mentions he has sold a number of paintings since they were married. She places one, a letter from Countess Corticelli, in her bosom. Another brings notice of Schön's engagement, which seems to trouble her. They sing a love duettino, Ich finde, Du siehst heute reizend aus – Ich komme aus dem Bad (I find you so beautiful today – I have just come from my bath). She is visited by Schigolch, who remarks of the artist (chamber music, Den hab'ich mir auch ganz anders vorgestellt; I thought he would be different than he is). Schigolch is an asthmatic beggar who seems to have been featured in her past in an unspecified way, he asks for money which she gives him, and when he calls her "Lulu", she says she has not been called that in a long time. As she is showing him out, Schön arrives (sonata movement) and recognises him, referring to him as Lulu's father, which she does not deny. Schön asks Lulu to stay out of his life from now on, since he is engaged and it would be scandalous for them to see each other socially, but she says she belongs only to him (coda: love theme. Wenn ich einem Menschen auf dieser Welt angehöre, gehöre ich Ihnen; If I belong to any man in this world, I belong to you). Their discussion reveals that all the good fortune Lulu has experienced comes from Schön's interventions, and that they have been meeting regularly. The exchange becomes increasingly agitated, until the return of the artist, who asks what has transpired. Lulu leaves in a huff, while Schön implies that he has had a longstanding affair with Lulu, since she was 12, and rescued her from the streets as a flower seller. The artist becomes increasingly distressed as he learns how little he knows about Lulu, not even her name, which appears to be different for every lover. Schön informs him about Schigolch being her father, and that after the death of his wife, Lulu appeared to be trying to take her place, so that he arranged to marry her off to Goll. Increasingly Schön urges the artist to confront Lulu, which he agrees to, leaving the room, but a terrible groan is heard offstage and Schön discovers the artist has locked the door. Lulu returns and they discuss what to do next, but are interrupted by the arrival of Alwa, who announces that revolution has broken out on the streets of Paris, which is causing consternation at the newspaper office. Lulu brings a hatchet, and they force open the door to find the artist dead. From a partly audible telephone conversation Schön has, which he implies is with the police, it is revealed that the artist cut his throat. Lulu, once again, is unmoved by the tragedy, while Schön and Alwa hope that the political news will sweep aside the scandal. When Schön calls her Ungeheuer! (Monster!), Lulu hints that she and Schön will be married after all (Lulu motif: Sie heiraten mich ja doch!; You will marry me after all). The curtain falls as the doorbell rings, which they believe is the police.Interlude (Love theme)Scene 3: In Lulu's dressing room in the theatre, a folding screen upstage, a poster of Lulu's portrait is seenLulu is changing behind the screen, Alwa is pouring champagne. The two discuss whether Schön will come that night, and a Prince who wants to take her to Africa. Alwa recalls his mother's death, and how he had hoped that Lulu would replace her, while Lulu observes that his father put her on the stage in the hope that someone rich would marry her and take her off his hands. Lulu emerges in a ballet dress, Alwa appears smitten and they drink. At the sound of a bell, Lulu leaves to take the stage. Alwa watches her leave and then contemplates writing an opera based on her life, but as he draws out the scenes he concludes that they are too gruesome. Applause can be heard, and the Prince enters and reveals his wish to marry Lulu. It is apparent her sudden fame is due to favourable reviews published by Schön. Suddenly the bell starts ringing incessantly and an uproar is heard offstage. Alwa appears startled and Lulu enters suddenly, flinging herself in a chair, followed by the dresser and theatre manager, who explain that she fainted. She implies it was because she saw Schön with his fiancée, Mit seiner Braut! (With his bride!) whereupon Schön himself enters and Lulu refuses to continue because his fiancée is in the audience. All try to persuade Lulu to return to the stage, in a sextet Das hättest Du Dir besser erspart! (This you could have spared yourself!), then Schön dismisses the company leaving Lulu and himself alone. He admonishes her, Wie kannst Du die Szene gegen mich ausspielen? (how can you play this scene to get me?), they argue and she taunts him with the Prince and his inability to break off their relationship. It is apparent that he is torn between the two women, and she begins to exploit his weakness, compelling him to write a letter that she dictates, breaking off the engagement (Letter duet: Sehr geehrtes Fräulein …; Most respected Fräulein ...). Schön expresses feelings of impending doom, Jetzt – kommt – die Hinrichtung... (Now – comes – the execution) and Lulu, having achieved her purpose, prepares to return to the stage

Act 2Scene 1: In Lulu's house, a magnificent German Renaissance style room with a gallery and staircase. A folding Chinese screen in front of the fireplace. Again, Lulu's portrait can be seen, this time on an easel. Lulu is in an armchair in a morning gown, Countess Geschwitz on an ottoman, in masculine clothes, her face veiled. Dr. Schön is standing.Countess Geschwitz, an admirer of Lulu, who is now married to Schön, is visiting her to invite her to a ball. She has brought flowers and, complimenting her on her portrait, wishes to paint her herself. Schön is clearly uncomfortable and Lulu shows Geschwitz out. Schön, left alone, appears disturbed and jealous and speaks of madness, producing a revolver, Der Irrsinn hat sich meiner Vernunft schon bemächtigt (Madness has conquered my reason already). On her return Lulu tries to convince Schön to take the afternoon off and go for a drive with her (cavatina: Könntest Du Dich für heute Nachmittag nicht freimachen?; Can't you make this afternoon free?), but he points out that he is due at the stock exchange. Lulu starts to lavish affection on Schön, and they go into the bedroom, whereupon Geschwitz reenters the house and hides behind the screen. Schigolch and two other admirers, the athlete, who is carrying the struggling schoolboy (played by a woman, i.e. a travesti role), all enter. Schigolch says that he also lives in the house and that they have paid him to leave them with Lulu, who then reappears. She is dressed for the ball, décolleté with orchids between her breasts. She leans in to the schoolboy, urging him to smell the flowers. As she leaves they begin to discuss the Prince, who has gone abroad (canon: Er hat sie nämlich ursprünglich heiraten wollen; She was the one he originally wanted to marry) and Schigolch says that he too wishes to marry Lulu, Wer hat sie nicht ursprünglich heiraten wollen! (Who has not always wanted to marry her!), a sentiment with which they all agree, as he explains that Lulu is not his daughter.

When Lulu returns, she also agrees that she never had a father. They discuss Schön, who has left for the exchange, and what Lulu calls his Verfolgungswahn (paranoia), but a servant announces his return and the athlete and schoolboy also hide while Schigolch starts to leave. However, it is Alwa who enters, not his father, and she orders refreshments as they sit and start to talk and flirt. Schön enters unnoticed, sees his son, and he too hides. Their conversation becomes more intense and Alwa declares his love for Lulu, Liebst Du mich Mignon? (Do you love me, Mignon?), burying his head in her lap. At this point, Lulu confesses to Alwa that she poisoned his mother. Meanwhile, unnoticed by the couple, Schön sees the athlete and draws his revolver, but the athlete indicates it is Alwa he should kill, and hides again. Lulu notices them and announces his presence.

Schön reveals himself, once again announcing revolution in Paris, newspaper in hand, and drags Alwa away. The athlete briefly reappears, pursued by Schön, revolver in hand. Schön, believing the athlete escaped, begins to harangue Lulu (aria in five strophes: Du Kreatur, die mich durch den Strassenkot zum Martertode schleift!; You wretch, that drags me through the faeces in the streets to martyrdom!), handing the revolver to Lulu, who appears unperturbed, and implying she should kill herself before he kills Alwa. She points the revolver at him, but instead she fires at the ceiling. Increasingly agitated, Schön seizes the revolver and begins to search the house for Lulu's lovers, but finds only Geschwitz, whom he locks in another room. Again he gives Lulu the gun, implying her suicide will save his reputation from being considered a cuckold, meine Stirn zu verzieren (my head to decorate) – i.e. with horns. Lulu sings the Lied der Lulu (Wenn sich die Menschen um meinetwillen umgebracht haben; When men have killed for my sake) in which she asks for a divorce, saying she can only be als was ich bin (what I am). Schön only replies that he will murder her and make it look like suicide, forcing her to her knees and pointing the gun at her while holding it in her hand (5th strophe: Nieder, Mörderin! In die Knie!; Get down, murderess, on your knees!). While Schön is momentarily distracted by the schoolboy's sudden appearance, Lulu empties the remaining five rounds into him. But he is still alive, and realises he has yet another 'rival', Und – da – ist – noch – einer! (And – there – is – another!). He calls for his son, who reappears, while Lulu appears remorseful, and then he dies. Lulu goes to leave but Alwa bars her way. She begs him not to give her up (arietta: Du kannst mich nicht dem Gericht ausliefern!; You cannot deliver me up to the Law!), which he refuses to do despite her offers to be his for the rest of her life, Ich will Dir treu sein mein Leben lang (I will be faithful to you my whole life long). Once again, a doorbell announces the arrival of the police.Interlude in the form of a silent film. Both film and the musical accompaniment are in the form of a palindrome. The film depicts four main events, pivoting on Lulu's one year in prison, and four following her imprisonment, forming the palindrome. The first sequence shows the arrest, detention, trial and the prison door closing. The second sequence shows the reverse with the prison door opening, the medical assessment, the isolation ward in hospital, and her escape. In each mirror event the number of people involved is the same, for example three people arrest her and three liberate her. As the palindrome progresses, Lulu loses hope in detention, is tried and transferred to prison, where she becomes resigned to her fate. There hope returns as she contracts cholera and after a further "trial" by doctors is transferred to hospital where hope grows as Geschwitz visits her, they change clothes, and Lulu escapes disguised as the other woman. During the palindrome many details and symbols, before and after prison, match each other, including Lulu's portrait, a recurring visual motif throughout the opera.Scene 2: The same place as scene 1, one year later, an air of neglect, daylight has been shut out. The portrait is now leaning against the fireplace, facing away from the audience,Geschwitz, Alwa and the athlete are anxiously awaiting Schigolch and discussing the escape plan. The athlete is dressed as Alwa's footman and is planning to marry Lulu and take her to Paris as an acrobat. Geschwitz appears frail and will take Lulu's place in hospital. She is funding the escape, but refuses Alwa's offer of financial help. She is going to sacrifice her own freedom by taking Lulu's place so that nobody will discover she has escaped until it is too late. When Schigolch arrives, he and Geschwitz depart for the hospital, while the other two men discuss their plans. Alwa has sold the newspaper and written a melodrama for Lulu to star in. They begin to argue over money but are interrupted by the schoolboy (chamber music II, Mit wem habe ich; With whom have I), who has just broken out of prison and devised a scheme to free Lulu. Alwa and the athlete lie to him that Lulu is dead, showing him a newspaper article about her illness, then throw him out. Schigolch arrives with Lulu (melodrama: Hü, kleine Lulu: – wir müssen heut' noch über die Grenze; Well, little Lulu: we must cross the border today), looking very pale and weak from her illness. The athlete is disgusted at seeing her in this state, abandons his plan and goes off saying that he will summon the police instead. Schigolch goes to buy train tickets. As soon as he has gone, Lulu, who has been acting the part of the invalid, makes an instant recovery. Now alone with Alwa, she explains the plot in detail. Geschwitz went to Hamburg to nurse cholera patients and deliberately infected both herself and Lulu with contaminated clothing so that they were both placed in an isolation ward together. After Geschwitz was discharged, she returned to visit Lulu and they changed places (melodrama: Jetzt liegt sie dort drüben als die Mörderin des Doktor Schön; Now she lies there as the murderer of Dr. Schön), while Lulu feigned illness to get rid of the athlete. Now alone with Alwa, the portrait is returned to the easel and Lulu seduces the willing Alwa once again. They declare their love for each other in a second love duet, uns sehen, so oft wir wollen (to see each other as often as we want) reaching its climax with Alwa's hymn to Lulu (hymne: Durch dieses Kleid empfinde ich Deinen Wuchs wie Musik; Through this dress I feel your body like music), and make plans to go away together. At the end of the duet and scene she asks him, Ist das noch der Diwan, – auf dem sich – dein Vater – verblutet hat? (Isn't this the sofa on which your father bled to death?).

Act 3Scene 1: A spacious drawing room in Lulu's luxurious house in Paris. Lulu's portrait hangs on the wall. The guests are assembledLulu is living in Paris under the alias of a French countess. A grand birthday party is taking place at her house and the athlete who is planning to get married proposes a toast to her. The Marquis shows an unusual interest in the 15-year-old girl. The guests move to the gaming room to play baccarat. The conversation moves to discussing shares in the Jungfrau Railway, which most of the guests at the party have invested in to varying extents, and which appear to be performing magnificently.

The Marquis has discovered Lulu's true identity, and is blackmailing her (duet:Sag es nur gleich heraus, wieviel du haben willst; Tell me without delay, how much money you want), threatening to hand her over to the authorities. She offers herself to him, having had a previous affair, but his interests lie more in trafficking women and girls for commercial sexual exploitation, Lied des Mächenhändlers: Ich sagte dir doch, daß ich auch Mächenhändler bin (song of the human tafficker: I told you I am a white slave trader). Again, Lulu sings about who she is and what she has become, as in her act II Lied; Ich tauge nicht für diesen Beruf. Als ich fünfzehn Jahre alt war, hätte mir das gefallen können (I'm no good for this sort of work, when I was fifteen it was different, I might have enjoyed it). The Marquis indicates he could summon the policeman stationed out in the street and claim the reward for her capture, but he would get a far higher price by selling her to a Cairo brothel to which he has sent a picture of her portrait as Eve. She offers to pay him, but he is aware that Alwa's fortune is all in the railway shares, and he wants cash, giving her a deadline later that day. She reads a note the athlete handed her just before the Marquis confronted her and learns that he too wants to blackmail her. Geschwitz accuses her of not returning the favours and affection she showed Lulu when they were in hospital. The athlete returns and makes apparent that he is still interested in Lulu's affections and also gives her a deadline, duet: Einen Moment! Hast du meinen Brief gelesen? (One Moment! Have you read my note?). A telegram arrives for the Banker informing him the railway shares are now worthless. When Schigolch arrives, asking for money for his girlfriend (duet: Ich brauche nämlich notwendig Geld...Ich miete meiner Geliebten eine Wohnung; I need some money now, I am renting an apartment for my lover), Lulu collapses in despair but confides in him.

Schigolch too has designs upon Lulu, but she persuades him that if he can arrange for the athlete's death she will give him the money, which he says he will do if she can persuade the athlete to come to his home, which she promises. The Marquis suspects the athlete, but he denies it. Lulu then convinces the athlete that if he spends the night with Geschwitz, she will pay Lulu, who can then pay him the blackmail money. She then persuades the countess that she will give herself to her if she spends the night with the athlete. Although puzzled, Geschwitz agrees to the bargain. Having achieved this, Lulu turns to her valet and orders him to change clothes with her. The news of the railway collapse spreads through the company to general despair. Lulu, dressed as her valet, informs Alwa they have been discovered and the police are on their way, and they escape. Again the scene ends with the arrival of the police, who confront the valet before realising their mistake.Scene 2: A windowless garret in London, with a leaking skylight. A bucket collects water dripping from the skylight. On the floor a torn mattress. A door leads to Lulu's bedroomAlwa and Schigolch are discussing their predicament. They and Lulu are now living in poverty and on the run. It is Lulu's first day of work as a Freudenmädchen (sex worker), from which they intend to make a living, although Alwa is ambivalent. When they hear Lulu approaching with her first client, a professor, they hide. The professor remains silent throughout, is very gentle and pays her generously. Lulu is thrilled. Geschwitz, now shabbily dressed, then arrives with the portrait of Lulu, which she has removed from the frame and brought from Paris. Lulu is disturbed at seeing it, but Alwa is inspired and hangs it on the wall, believing it will please the clients, and they discuss the fate of the artist, quartet: Ihr Körper stand auf dem Höhepunkt (Her body, then, was at it highest peak). Lulu goes out to prove her attractiveness, leaving with Geschwitz. Alwa reveals that Lulu had contracted venereal disease from the Marquis and in turn passed it on to him.

Lulu returns with her second client, the Negro, Komm nur herein, mein Schatz! Komm! (Come in, my love! Come in!), who becomes angry at being asked to pay in advance and attacks her. Alwa rushes to her defence but is killed by the Negro, who then leaves, followed by Lulu in despair while Schigolch removes the body. Geschwitz returns, saying Lulu sent her away, while Schigolch leaves. She produces a gun and considers killing herself, bitterly believing that Lulu would shed mir keine Träne nach (not one tear for me), then changes her mind and goes to hang herself, pausing first in reverence before Lulu's portrait. She is interrupted by the entrance of Lulu and her third client, Jack the Ripper. When asked, she says Geschwitz is her crazy sister. Jack makes to leave, saying he has little money and she is asking too much. She pleads with him and they haggle over the price, while she reveals it is her first day on the job, as he suspected. He also guesses the true nature of Geschwitz's feelings for Lulu. Lulu says she is drawn to Jack and eventually offers to give herself to him without payment. They go into the bedroom. Geschwitz, left to herself, resolves to return to Germany to become a lawyer and work for women's rights. On hearing Lulu's screams, she rushes to the bedroom door but Jack emerges with a blood-stained knife that he plunges into her body, and she collapses. Jack calmly washes his hands in the basin, not believing his luck at having killed two women at once, Ich bin doch ein verdammter Glückspilz! (I am just the luckiest of men!), complains about the lack of a towel and leaves. In her dying breath Geschwitz declares her eternal love for Lulu, Lulu! Mein Engel! Laß dich noch einmal sehn! Ich bin dir nah! Bleibe dir nah! In Ewigkeit! (Lulu! My Angel! Let me see you one more time! I am close! Stay close! For eternity!).

 Analysis 

 Dramatic 
The character of Lulu has been described as embodying both elements of female sexuality's dualism, earth-mother and whore. In the words of Karl Kraus, she is the woman "who became the destroyer of all because everyone destroyed her". Berg's involvement with the lower depths of society in his two dramatic works, Wozzeck and Lulu, surprised even Schoenberg. Like Wozzeck, Lulu is social criticism, a tragedy in which the protagonists are portrayed as victims, gradually becoming enslaved to social forces they are too weak to deal with. Palindromes in the piece take many forms, such as the rise and fall of Lulu and the recycling of the actors: the three men whose deaths she contributes to become Lulu's three clients, and the man she murdered murders her. Alwa, thought to be the antithesis of Lulu, was changed from Wedekind's dramatist to Berg's composer and is assumed to be a stand-in for Berg himself. In all cases, the music underscores and confirms Berg's dramatic allusions.

 Musical 

Instrumentation

Pit orchestra

Woodwinds
 3 flutes (all doubling piccolos)
 3 oboes (3rd doubling English horn)
 3 clarinets in B (1st and 2nd doubling E clarinets) 
 bass clarinet in B
 alto saxophone in E
 3 bassoons (3rd doubling contrabassoon)
Brass
 4 horns in F
 3 trumpets in C
 3 trombones
 tuba

Percussion 
 timpani
 triangle
 tambourine
 snare drum
 jazz drum
 bass drum
 cymbals
 switch
 2 tam-tams (high and low)
 xylophone
 vibraphone
Keyboard
 piano

Strings
 harp
 violins I
 violins II
 violas
 cellos
 double basses

Special groups
The onstage jazz band in act 1, scene 3 (instrumentalists can be drawn from the pit players) consists of:

 2 clarinets in B
 alto saxophone in E
 tenor saxophone in B
 2 Jazz trumpets in C
 2 Jazz trombones
 sousaphone

 Jazz drum set (3 players)
 banjo
 piano
 3 violins with jazz horns
 contrabass

In act 3, scene 2, Cerha's edition uses a small onstage ensemble that requires:

 piccolo
 flute
 3 clarinets in B
 bass clarinet in B
 contrabassoon

In Lulu, Berg introduced the vibraphone into the orchestra of Western art music, an instrument that had been previously solely associated with jazz.

Structure

Berg was obsessed with symmetry in his works and Lulu is no exception, the whole being perceived as a palindrome or mirror. Lulu's popularity in the first act is mirrored by the squalor she lives in during act 3, and this is emphasised by Lulu's husbands in act 1 being played by the same singers as her clients in act 3. The motifs associated with each are repeated.

This mirrorlike structure is further emphasised by the film interlude at act 2 at the very centre of the work. The events shown in the film are a miniature version of the mirror structure of the opera as a whole (Lulu enters prison and then leaves again) and the music accompanying the film is an exact palindrome – it reads the same forwards as backwards. The centre of this palindrome is indicated by an arpeggio played on the piano, first rising, then falling (shown here on the top staff).

Berg assigns specific vocal styles to each character with descriptive orchestral representation, recapitulative episodes to emphasise psychological significance and pitch-sets. Recapitulation includes having single singers performing multiple roles. The use of pitch includes the use of twelve-tone rows.

Serialism
Cell z (also one of the basic cells in Béla Bartók's String Quartet No. 4) is the basic cell of Lulu and generates trope I:

Although some of Lulu is freely composed, Berg also makes use of Schoenberg's twelve-tone technique. Rather than using one tone row for the entire work, however, he gives each character his or her own tone row, meaning that the tone rows act rather like the leitmotifs in Richard Wagner's operas.

From this one tone row, Berg derives tone rows for many of the characters. For example, the tone row associated with Lulu herself is: F, G, A, B, C, D, F, D, E, A, B, C. This row is constructed by extracting one note (F) from the basic row's first trichord, then taking the next note (G) from the basic row's second trichord, then taking the third note (A) from the basic row's third trichord, and so on, cycling through the basic row three times.

The tone row associated with Alwa is arrived at by repeating the basic tone row over and over and taking every seventh note;

this results in the following tone row: B, F, E, G, F, B, E, D, A, C, C, G

Similarly, the tone row associated with Dr. Schön is arrived at by repeating the basic tone row (as in the previous example) and taking the first note, missing one note, taking the next, missing two, taking the next, missing three, taking the next, missing three, taking the next, missing two, taking the next, missing one, taking the next, missing one, taking the next, missing two, taking the next, and so on; this results in the following tone row: B, E, G, G, D, F, E, A, B, C, F, C

 Posthumous history 
The opera was first performed by the Zürich Opera in an incomplete form on June 2, 1937. Erwin Stein made a vocal score of the whole of act 3 following Berg's death, and Helene Berg, Alban's widow, approached Schoenberg to complete the orchestration. Schoenberg at first accepted, but upon being sent copies of Berg's sketches he changed his mind, saying that it would be a more time-consuming task than he had thought. Helene subsequently forbade anybody else to complete the opera, and for over 40 years only the first two acts could be given complete, usually with the act 3 portions of the Lulu Suite played in place of act 3. The last recording made of the original two-act version—Christoph von Dohnányi conducting the Vienna Philharmonic, with Anja Silja in the title role (Decca/London, recorded 1976 and released 1978)—presented it in this form.

Director Heinz Ruckert shot the silent film featured at the midpoint according to Berg's exacting specifications. The film wordlessly depicts Lulu's arrest, trial, incarceration, and ultimate liberation thanks to the cunning of the Countess Geschwitz. Like the music for this sequence (and the opera as a whole), the film has a palindromic structure. The original film is lost save for four stills which remain in the Zürich Stadtarchiv. Each successive production requires a new film to be shot with the stage actors, though many recent productions have omitted the film altogether.

Performance history
After the Zürich premiere, the opera was seen at La Fenice on 4 September 1949 during the Venice Biennale, conducted by Sanzogno. The German premiere was at the Grillo-Theater in Essen on 7 March 1953 with Carla Spletter in the title role, and the Netherlands premiere on July 7 of that year at the Stadsschouwburg in Amsterdam as part of the Holland Festival, both with  conducted by Gustav König and broadcast to the UK on the BBC on 10 August. This was followed by a production at Hamburg in 1957 with Helga Pilarczyk in a Günther Rennert production, conducted by Leopold Ludwig which was also seen at the Paris Opera in 1960 and La Scala in 1963, and Sadler's Wells 1962.

In its two-act form plus sketches of the third act, Lulu made its American debut at the Santa Fe Opera in New Mexico during the 1963 season, with the American soprano Joan Carroll in the title role, together with Donald Gramm (Schön), Elaine Bonazzi (Geschwitz), and George Shirley (Alwa), with Robert Craft conducting. The Opera's general director, John Crosby, attempted to negotiate for Santa Fe to stage the American premiere of the full three-act opera, but was not successful. A notable Lulu, Silja, made her debut in a Wieland Wagner production at the Staatsoper Stuttgart in 1966 (which was later filmed, with Carlos Alexander as Schön). In 1967 the Metropolitan Opera presented the Hamburg State Opera production with Ludwig conducting, Toni Blankenheim (Schön), Anneliese Rothenberger (Lulu), Kerstin Meyer (Geschwitz), Gerhard Unger (Alwa), Kim Borg (Schigolch) and Maria von Ilosvay (Theatre dresser). This production was recorded by Electrola the following year. Celebrated Lulus have included Evelyn Lear, Teresa Stratas, Nancy Shade, Karan Armstrong, Julia Migenes, Barbara Hannigan, Christine Schäfer, and Marlis Petersen.

Helene Berg's death in 1976 paved the way for a new completed version of the opera to be made by Friedrich Cerha. There was insufficient time to have the score of this three-act version ready for the first production of the work at the Metropolitan Opera in April 1977 (in a production by John Dexter, with Carole Farley in the title role), so the incomplete version was used. Published in 1979, the Cerha completion premiered on 24 February the same year at the Opera Garnier and was conducted by Pierre Boulez, with Stratas singing the lead role; the production (by Patrice Chéreau) was a sensation and the recording won the Gramophone Award for 1979.

The U.S. premiere of the complete opera was on 28 July 1979 at Santa Fe, with Nancy Shade (Lulu), William Dooley (Schön), Katherine Ciesinski (Geschwitz) and Barry Busse (Alwa). The Metropolitan Opera first presented it in December 1980, a performance later released on DVD. Its 2015 production, with Marlis Petersen in the title role, was broadcast in high definition on 21 November. That production featured projections and animated drawings by William Kentridge. The same production, with a different cast, also played at De Nationale Opera, Amsterdam (2015), the English National Opera, London in 2016, and the Teatro dell'Opera di Roma (2017).

 Recordings 

 See also 

 List of sex workers in literature

 Notes 

References

 Sources 
 Books 

 
 
 
 
 
 , see also The Complete Opera Book
 
 
 
 
 
 
 
 
 
 
 
 

Chapters, articles and theses

 
 
 

 , in 
 , in 
 
 

 Discography and recordings 

 
  Synopsis pp. 18–23; Libretto pp. 116–203
 , in 
 
 
 

 Other 

 
 
 
 
 
 
 
 
 

Further reading

  Originally published by Suhrkamp Verlag, Frankfurt.
 
 , in 
 
 
 
 
 
 
 
 

External links

 
"An Opera of Permanent Catastrophe, and of Hope" by Peter E. Gordon, The Nation'', 3 December 2015
 
 

Operas by Alban Berg
German-language operas
Unfinished operas
Operas completed by others
Cultural depictions of Jack the Ripper
Berg
1937 operas
Operas
Operas based on plays
Twelve-tone compositions
Expressionist music
Stefan Zweig Collection
Adultery in theatre
LGBT-related plays
LGBT-related operas
Adaptations of works by Frank Wedekind